LBJ is a 1991 two-part television documentary film about Lyndon B. Johnson, the 36th president of the United States. Produced by PBS for The American Experience (now American Experience) documentary program, it recounts Johnson's life from his childhood to his presidency up to his death. Written, co-produced and directed by David Grubin and narrated by David McCullough, the film first aired on PBS in two parts on September 30, 1991.

Interviewees

Robert Baker, Senate aide
George Ball, Undersecretary of State
Larry Berman, Vietnam historian
William P. Bundy, Assistant Secretary of State
S. Douglas Cater, Washington, D.C. reporter
Clark Clifford, presidential adviser
John Connally, campaign aide; advisor
Ava Cox, cousin
Robert Dallek, biographer
Homer Dean, campaign supporter
Rebecca Doggert, Newark Head Start
Ronnie Dugger, biographer
Daniel Ellsberg, Defense Department staff
James Farmer, civil rights activist
J. William Fulbright, Senate Foreign Relations Committee
Doris Kearns Goodwin, biographer
Richard Goodwin, presidential speechwriter
Lewis Gould, historian
Nicholas Katzenbach, Attorney General
Eliot Janeway, economist; family friend
Lady Bird Johnson, First Lady
Donald Malafronte, aide to Mayor of Newark
Harry McPherson, Senate staff
Rep. James Pickle, campaign worker
George Reedy, White House press secretary
Dean Rusk, Secretary of State
Howard Schuman, Senate aide
Sergeant Shriver, Peace Corps director
E. Babe Smith, Pedernales Electric Co-op
James Thomson Jr., National Security Council staff
Jack Valenti, special assistant to the president
Elizabeth Wickenden, family friend
Roger Wilkins, Johnson administration attorney
Lee Williams, aide to Senator Fulbright
Andrew Young, civil rights activist

Critical response
Walter Goodman of The New York Times gave LBJ a positive review, stating that "Mr. Grubin demonstrates the mastery of the television documentary that makes his work an absorbing start to a new season of 'The American Experience.' [...] It is a powerful story, powerfully rendered."

Home media
LBJ was first released by PBS on VHS in two separate editions for both of its two parts, and was later given a single VHS release on September 23, 1997. PBS released the film on DVD without extras on February 14, 2006, and later included it in an American Experience DVD box set collecting its films about United States presidents on August 26, 2008.

References

External links
PBS official site

1991 television films
1991 films
1991 documentary films
American Experience
American documentary television films
Documentary films about presidents of the United States
Documentary films about the Vietnam War
Films about Lyndon B. Johnson
Films directed by David Grubin
1990s English-language films
1990s American films